Admiral Gerald Walter Russell (17 January 1850 – 7 November 1928) was a Royal Navy officer who was Captain-Superintendent of Pembroke Dockyard throughout 1902–1904.

Naval career

Russell entered the Royal Navy, and was promoted to lieutenant on 13 March 1873 (with seniority from 19 January) while serving on the China Station, confirming a commission given by Vice-Admiral Charles Shadwell, Commander-in-Chief on the China Station, following the death of another officer. He was promoted to commander on 31 December 1883, and was appointed in command of the surveying ship  in 1890. In April 1900, he was appointed in command of the pre-dreadnought battleship , serving in the Channel Fleet. During his command, the ship was among the huge fleet of ships present in the Solent for the passage of the body of Queen Victoria from Cowes to Portsmouth on 2 February 1901. 

On 1 October 1902, Russell was appointed Captain-Superintendent, Pembroke Dockyard, in which post he maintained for two years, until he was promoted to flag rank as rear-admiral on 1 September 1904. He was placed on the Retired List at his own request on 1 March 1908, and was promoted to the rank of vice-admiral (on the Retired List) on 2 July 1908, and to admiral on 30 July 1912.

He died in 1928.

Personal life

References

External links

1850 births
1928 deaths
Royal Navy admirals